The Akwayafe River (also known as the Akpakorum River) is a river in Africa that empties into the Gulf of Guinea. The river forms a portion of the land boundary between Cameroon and Nigeria.

See also
Communes of Cameroon

International rivers of Africa
Rivers of Nigeria
Rivers of Cameroon
Cameroon–Nigeria border